Antioch is a ghost town in Houston County, Texas, United States.  Only a small Baptist church remains in the area.

References
Christopher Long, "ANTIOCH, TX (HOUSTON COUNTY)," Handbook of Texas Online (http://www.tshaonline.org/handbook/online/articles/hrabb), accessed September 10, 2012. Published by the Texas State Historical Association.

Populated places in Houston County, Texas
Ghost towns in East Texas